Horologica lizardensis is a species of sea snail, a gastropod in the family Cerithiopsidae,.

It was described by Nützel, in 1998.

Distribution
This marine species occurs off Papua New Guinea.

References

 Cecalupo A. & Perugia I. (2018). New species of Cerithiopsidae (Gastropoda: Triphoroidea) from Papua New Guinea (Pacific Ocean). Visaya. suppl. 11: 1–187. page(s): 33, pl. 13 figs 2a-

Cerithiopsidae
Gastropods described in 1998